The Castel Casoar was a training glider built in the late 1930s in France. It was a glider of high-wing monoplane configuration.

Specifications

References

Glider aircraft